Joanne Rycroft-Malone  is a British researcher who is a Distinguished Professor and the Executive Dean of the Faculty of Health and Medicine at Lancaster University. She is Programme Director and Chair of the Health and Social Care Delivery Research programme.

Early life and education 
Rycroft-Malone was born in Normanton on Trent. Her parents are from Yorkshire. She has said that as a child she wanted to be a nurse, a pilot and a historian. She trained as a nurse in London, and worked briefly in the pharmaceutical industry. She eventually graduated with degrees in nursing, psychology and occupational psychology. She earned her doctorate at the University of Southampton, where she researched the involvement of patients in discussions about medication.

Research and career 
Rycroft-Malone is an expert in mixed methods applied health research. She has studied evidenced-based medicine and nursing. She was appointed to Bangor University in 2006, where she was made a Professor of Health Services. In 2014, she was appointed to the Betsi Cadwaladr University Health Board.

In 2019, Rycroft-Malone joined Lancaster University as Executive Dean. At Lancaster, she oversaw the development of the Health Innovation Campus. She serves on the Medical Schools Council and Chairs the National Institute for Health and Care Excellence (NICE) Implementation Strategy Group.

Selected publications

References 

1965 births
People from Nottinghamshire (before 1974)
Alumni of the University of Southampton
Academics of Lancaster University
Living people
20th-century British scientists
20th-century British women scientists
21st-century British scientists
21st-century British women scientists